Declan Hughes (born 1963) is an Irish novelist, playwright and screenwriter. He has been Writer-in-Association with the Abbey Theatre in Dublin and Irish Writer Fellow at Trinity College, Dublin. He has written a series of crime novels featuring the Irish-American detective Ed Loy.  The name "Loy" is a homage to the character Sam Spade from The Maltese Falcon: a loy is a traditional Irish spade.

His most recent novel is All the Things You Are (2014), which follows City of Lost Girls (2010), All the Dead Voices (2009), The Price of Blood (2008), The Dying Breed, The Color of Blood (2007) and  The Wrong Kind of Blood (2006).

His plays include Shiver (2003), Digging for Fire and New Morning. 

Hughes lives in Dublin with his wife and two daughters.

Novels
 All The Things You Are (2014)
 City of Lost Girls (2010) 	
 All the Dead Voices (2009) 	
 Dying Breed (2008) - US title: The Price of Blood 
 The Colour of Blood (2007) 
 The Wrong Kind of Blood (2006)

Plays
 I Can't Get Started (1990)
 Digging for Fire (1991)
 New Morning (1992)
 Hallowe'en Night (1992)
 Love and a Bottle (1992)
 Twenty Grand (1998)
 Shiver (2003) 
 The Last Summer (2012)

References

External links
 

1963 births
Irish novelists
Irish male novelists
Irish mystery writers
Irish male screenwriters
Irish screenwriters
Irish dramatists and playwrights
Irish male dramatists and playwrights
Shamus Award winners
21st-century Irish novelists
Living people
21st-century Irish screenwriters